Shymbulak, also known as Chimbulak is a ski resort near Almaty. It is the largest ski resort in Central Asia. It is popular for its mild climate, large quantity of sunny days and great amount of snow through the winter (from November till May).

History

Shymbulak (also known as "Chimbulak") was discovered by amateur skiers in the 1940s. Soon after, it became the first downhill route in the Soviet Union. Skiers originally needed to climb up the mountain tops on foot (which took roughly 3 hours). In 1954 a 1500 meters ski tow was built. 

Starting from 1961, Shymbulak hosted several USSR Championships and the Silver Edelweisse prize skiing competitions. 

In 1983 it became the Olympic ski training center for the USSR. During this time, various commodities were built including restaurants and hotels.

In 1985, after a thorough study of the conditions for competitions at Shymbulak, the International Ski Federation (FIS) approved three local tracks: Shymbulak-Talgar for downhill, Shymbulak for slalom and giant slalom.

In 1995 the school of alpine skiing and snowboarding "Shymbulak" was opened. The school is a member of the International Ski Instructors Association ISIA.

The annual "Artyemenko" Prize competition has been held in Shymbulak since 2011. The competition is held in February. Almaty hosted the 2011 Asian Winter Games, bid for 2014 Winter Olympics, considered a bid for 2018 Winter Olympics, but decided to bid for 2022 Winter Olympics instead; Shymbulak was a venue for the alpine skiing events (both speed and technical), and would have been for the latter.

Ski area information 

The Shymbylak ski resort is located in the upper part of the Medeu Valley in the Zaiilisky Alatau mountain range, 25 km from Almaty. The resort can be reach by Gondola cars from Medeu.

The duration of the ski season is from November to April.

The ski areas span over 3000 ft of vertical drop (920m) and nearly 7.5 miles (12 km) of ski runs. There are three ski lifts at the resort with the highest going to 3200 meters above sea  level. At that level there is also a Hotel located at the Resort, enabling those wishing to ski during the day, have a place to stay at night.

It is popular for its mild climate, large quantity of sunny days and great amount of snow through the winter (from November till May). 
The resort offers a ski and snowboard school.  There is also Shymbulak hotel (4 stars) and ski, snowboard and sleigh rentals.

There are three ski lifts, which cumulatively reach Talgar pass ( above the sea level), the highest point of the ski resort. There are 3 stations of them; the first one is Intersection Station ( above the sea level) (9 minute trip), then 20th Prop Station ( above the sea level) (16.5 minutes) and Talgar pass Station ( above the sea level). There is also Snow-Park for the fans of snowboarding.

In November 2021, the Shymbulak Ski Resort held an opening ceremony for a night skiing course on the Talgar Pass.

Gallery

See also 

Shymbulak on Wikimapia
 List of ski areas and resorts in Asia

References

External links
 Shymbulak Ski Resort

Ski areas and resorts in Kazakhstan
Sport in Almaty
Tourist attractions in the Soviet Union